Paraperla is a genus of green stoneflies in the family Chloroperlidae. There are at least two described species in Paraperla.

Species
These two species belong to the genus Paraperla:
 Paraperla frontalis (Banks, 1902) (hyporheic sallfly)
 Paraperla wilsoni Ricker, 1965

References

Further reading

 
 

Chloroperlidae
Articles created by Qbugbot